Great Chocolate Showdown is a Canadian cooking competition television series that airs on Food Network Canada, themed around chocolate baking and confections. The show is carried in the United States by The CW Network.

The first season of the series officially premiered on February 4, 2020, with judges Steven Hodge, Anna Olson, and Cynthia Stroud. Episode 1, "The World Needs S'more People Like You", received a nomination for a Canadian Screen Award in the category of "Editing in a reality or competition program or series". The second season premiered on February 22, 2021, while the third season debuted on March 1, 2022, retaining the same cast of judges.

The show features product placement from Purdy's Chocolates, which is the "official chocolate sponsor" of the show. Some challenges are presented by a representative of the company.

Format 

Each season begin with 10 amateur home bakers. After each episode, a contestant is eliminated, until a finale episode to determine the season winner. Episodes typically consist of two challenges: an initial "Technique Test" and a "Chocolate Elimination Challenge". Winners of the skills challenge receive either immunity from elimination, or an advantage in the elimination round. Season winners receive a grand prize of $50,000.

Season 1

Contestants 

 Fadi Odeh – Dallas, Texas
 Casey Hallen – New York City, New York 
 Craig Taylor – Vancouver, British Columbia 
 Andrew Keen – Falls Church, Virginia 
 Renu Mathew – Olds, Alberta
 T. Lawrence-Simon – Somerville, Massachusetts 
 Venessa Liang – Saskatoon, Saskatchewan 
 Katie Rochin – Montreal, Quebec
 Trinity Andrew – Los Angeles, California 
 Kathy Choffe — Aurora, Ontario

Episodes

Elimination Table 

†The baker(s) that won in the first round.

Season 2

Contestants 

 Sheldon Taylor-Timothy, 30 – Rehabilitation Assistant and Bouncer, Toronto, Ontario
 Richard Martemucci, 56 – Retiree, Philadelphia, Pennsylvania
 Tam Truong, 42 – Real Estate Appraiser
 Latice Williams, 37 – Dental Office Manager, McKinney, Texas
 Jujhar Mann, 21 – Student, Surrey, British Columbia
 Raphael Nishida, 32 – Commercial Operations Manager
 Saudat (Sabby) Atta, 25 – IT Manager, Vancouver, British Columbia
 Abbey White, 34 – Retail Operations Specialist
 Atikah Mohamed, 35 – Campus Administrator, Toronto, Ontario
 Ginny Lepp, 59 – Civil Servant, Toronto, Ontario

Episodes

Season 3

Contestants 

 Amber Horn, 43, Bartender, Las Vegas, Nevada
 Bri Brown, 33, Office Manager, Detroit, Michigan
 Connie Kazan, 42, Stay-at-home Mom, Dearborn, Michigan
 Evan Morgan-Newpher, 31, Zoo Guest Services Manager, Tulsa, Oklahoma
 Gavan Knox, 44, Stay-at-home Dad, Scarborough, Ontario
 Ian Frias, 28, Finance Manager, Saskatoon, Saskatchewan 
 Lexi Christiansen, 24, Model, Vancouver, British Columbia
 Maile Crewdson, 35, Stay-at-home Mom, Maui, Hawaii
 Shyam Rethinavelu, 34, Fashion Stylist, San Francisco, California 
 Vince Driver, 31, Freelance Artist, Atlanta, Georgia

Episodes

International broadcasts

In January 2021, The CW picked up the series for broadcast in the United States. It premiered on the channel on January 29, 2022. Season 3 began airing on August 11, 2022.

In Australia, it premiered on the Lifestyle Food channel on November 11, 2021.

See also 

Great Chocolate Showdown on The CW

References 

2020s Canadian reality television series
2020 Canadian television series debuts
English-language television shows
Cooking competitions in Canada
Food reality television series
Food Network (Canadian TV channel) original programming
Chocolate culture
Television series by Corus Entertainment